Terence Higgins  may refer to:

People
 Terence Higgins, Baron Higgins (born 1928), British Conservative Party politician, former MP
 Terence Higgins (judge), Chief Justice of the Australian Capital Territory
 Terry Higgins, in whose memory the Terrence Higgins Trust was named

Other
Terrence Higgins Trust, charity